Killer at Large may refer to:

 Killer at Large (1936 film), American mystery film directed by David Selman
 Killer at Large (1947 film), American crime film directed by William Beaudine